Bảo Lộc (old name in Ma language: B’Lao) is a city of Lâm Đồng Province in the Central Highlands region of Vietnam. Bảo Lộc is famous for its registered trademark: B'lao tea. As of 2018 the town district had a population of 170,920. The district covers an area of 229 km2. The district capital lies at Bảo Lộc.

Subdivisions
Bảo Lộc has six urban wards and five communes.

The wards are:

Ward I - 4.3144 km2
Ward II - 6.6215 km2
B’Lao Ward - 5.4029 km2
Lộc Phát Ward- 25.7302 km2
Lộc Tiến Ward - 13.0119 km2
Lộc Sơn Ward - 12.3669 km2

The communes are:

Lộc Thanh - 20.8098 km2
Đam B’ri - 32.201 km2
Lộc Nga - 16.0319 km2
Đại Lào - 59.2579 km2
Lộc Châu - 36.1955 km2

Climate

Local sights
Older buildings in Bảo Lộc include the Bát Nhã Temple. Hồ Đồng Nai lake is a small lake situated in the central part of the town.

References

Populated places in Lâm Đồng province
Districts of Lâm Đồng province
Cities in Vietnam